Hoffman is a 1970 British comedy-drama film directed by Alvin Rakoff and starring Peter Sellers, Sinéad Cusack, Ruth Dunning and Jeremy Bulloch. It is the tale of an older man who blackmails an attractive young woman into spending a week with him in his flat in London, hoping that she will forget her crooked fiancé and fall in love with him instead.

The film features one of Sellers' rare non-comedic performances.

Plot
Telling her fiancé Tom that she must spend a week with her sick grandmother, Janet instead goes to the flat of Hoffman, a recently divorced executive whom she hardly knows from the firm where she works. Her visit is not voluntary; Hoffman claims to have evidence that could send Tom to jail and has blackmailed her into spending the week with him. Although he desires Janet, Hoffman is still bitter about women and, without pressuring her physically, bullies her psychologically. Young and inexperienced, she eventually begins to fight back and even initiates some sexual provocation, insulting Hoffman when he does not respond.

Hoffman and Janet are interrupted when Tom comes looking for his missing fiancée after receiving an anonymous phone call from Hoffman, and Janet leaves with Tom. Discussing the situation, Tom and his mother ask Janet to return to Hoffman and to continue treating him well in order to keep Tom out of jail. Dismayed that Tom and his mother are more concerned for themselves than for her, Janet returns to Hoffman and negotiates the terms of his invitation to become his permanent companion.

Cast
 Peter Sellers as Benjamin Hoffman
 Sinéad Cusack as Janet Smith
 Jeremy Bulloch as Tom Mitchell
 Ruth Dunning as Mrs. Mitchell
 David Lodge as Foreman
 John Tatham as Man in Restaurant

Production
Forbes arranged for Peter Sellers as the film's star, but Sellers did not wish to work with Rakoff. However, Forbes insisted that Rakoff remain, and Sellers eventually agreed to work with him. Rakoff later said: "Then we got on like a house on fire."

Director Alvin Rakoff claimed that Sellers had originally wanted to play the role comically, with an Austrian accent. Rakoff persuaded him to play it straight, but says that Sellers then "went the other way -- his Hoffman is dark and slow. I kept trying to get Peter to do it faster but he wouldn't. He argued for this brooding quality."

Sellers reportedly despised Hoffman because the lead character is so similar to his own personality. Arbeid said: "Benjamin Hoffman is very lonely, very insecure, very self deprecating; and these were all terms used by people to describe the real Sellers. So there was much of the character already in the actor... He had to play the internal self that wasn't there to begin with. He couldn't rely on mimicry, and he went through the torture of not knowing who Hoffman was because he didn't know who he was."

Development
In 1967 a televised play titled Call Me Daddy, starring Donald Pleasence and Judy Cornwell, was broadcast as part of the Armchair Theatre series. It was written by Ernest Gébler and directed by Alvin Rakoff. The play was well-received and won an international Emmy. Gébler turned the story into a novel titled Shall I Eat You Now?, published the following year. Producer Ben Arbeid optioned the screen rights to the novel and hired Gébler to write the script for a fee of £21,000.

In August 1969, the film was announced by Bryan Forbes, with Sinéad Cusack and Peter Sellers, for Associated British Picture Corporation, later, one of the first greenlit by Bryan Forbes while he was head of EMI Films.

Filming
The film was shot in the autumn of 1969, including seven weeks at Elstree Studios and a week on location at Thames Embankment and Wimbledon Common.

Rakoff claimed that Sellers and Cusack began a short, intense love affair during filming.

Release
According to Bryan Forbes, head of EMI Films when the film was produced, Sellers entered a depressive phase after filming was completed and asked to purchase the camera negative and remake the film. However, as the film had already been delivered to EMI, it was too late to accommodate Sellers' request. Producer Ben Arbeid said: "He had ample opportunity to discuss the film with me before it was delivered to them as a finished piece. Sellers just wanted to eliminate it."

In an interview, Sellers said that the film was a disaster.

Arbeid said that Sellers "was so good, so convincing, he tried to buy the prints and burn them. Not because he was ashamed of the film, but because he'd recognised aspects of the inner man he thought he'd hidden forever."

Censorship
The film experienced trouble with censors but was ultimately assigned an AA rating.

Reception
The film was not a success at the box office. Producer Ben Arbeid said that the film received poor distribution, in part because of a conflict between Bryan Forbes and Bernard Delfont, head of EMI. Arbeid commented that the film "was an unusual piece, not what you'd expect of a Peter Sellers performance."

In 1975, the film's writer Ernest Gébler turned Call Me Daddy into a play.

The film was not screened in New York until 1982.

Mike Sutton of the BFI believes that the film "contains one of Sellers’ most interesting performances."

Home media
The film was released on Blu-ray disc by Powerhouse Films in January 2022.

Notes

References

External links
 
 Hoffman at BFI
 
 Call Me Daddy 1967 production at IMDb
 Call Me Daddy 1967 production at BFI
 Review at New York Times

1970 films
1970 drama films
British drama films
Films directed by Alvin Rakoff
Films shot at Associated British Studios
Films set in London
Films scored by Ron Grainer
EMI Films films
1970s English-language films
1970s British films